Paro may refer to:

 Matteo Paro (born 1983), Italian footballer
 Paro (robot), a therapeutic robot baby harp seal
 Paro, Bhutan
 Paro Airport, Bhutan
 Paro District, Bhutan
 Paro, a  Moai on Rapa Nui (Easter Island) 
 Paro, a fictional character in Devdas (novella)
 Páró, the Hungarian name for Părău Commune, Braşov County, Romania
 Paro (spider), a genus of Linyphiidae spiders
 Paro, Nej' song

See also

 Para (disambiguation)
 Pare (disambiguation)
 Pari (disambiguation)
 Paro Chhu, a river of western Bhutan
 Dave Parro
 Pero (disambiguation)
 Piro (disambiguation)
 Puroresu

Italian-language surnames